Simón Bolívar is a simple-station that is part of the TransMilenio mass-transit system of Bogotá, Colombia.

Location
Simón Bolívar is located north of downtown Bogotá, specifically on Avenida NQS with Calle 63 G.

History
This station opened in 2005 as part of the second line of phase two of TransMilenio construction, opening service to Avenida NQS. It serves the demand to the eastern entrance of Parque Simón Bolívar and the surrounding areas.

Station services

Old trunk services

Trunk services

Feeder routes
This station does not have connections to feeder routes.

Inter-city service
This station does not have inter-city service.

See also
 List of TransMilenio Stations

TransMilenio